Jacobus van Egmond (17 February 1908 – 9 January 1969) was a Dutch track cyclist who competed at the 1932 Summer Olympics. He won a gold medal in the sprint and a silver in the 1000 m time trial; he finished fourth in the tandem, together with Bernard Leene.

Van Egmond took up sports after the 1928 Olympics, and first trained in running. He then changed to track cycling and won the national sprint title in 1931 and 1932. At the 1932 Olympics he went flat out in the sprint and time trial, and had no power left for the tandem event. Next year he won the world title in the sprint. He turned professional in 1934, and won the national sprint titles in 1934-36. Beginning in 1938, he ran a grocery store and then a self-service laundry. In 1954 he opened Café van Egmond, which was later managed by his son Paul, who was a professional football player.

See also
 List of Dutch Olympic cyclists

References

External links

1908 births
1969 deaths
Dutch male cyclists
Olympic gold medalists for the Netherlands
Olympic silver medalists for the Netherlands
Cyclists at the 1932 Summer Olympics
Olympic cyclists of the Netherlands
Dutch track cyclists
Sportspeople from Haarlem
Olympic medalists in cycling
Medalists at the 1932 Summer Olympics
Cyclists from North Holland
20th-century Dutch people